Valentin Borş (born 17 July 1983 in Focşani, Romania) is a Romanian football player. He is also a futsal player for Progresul Focșani in the Romanian first division.

External links

1983 births
Living people
Sportspeople from Focșani
Romanian footballers
Association football goalkeepers
Liga I players
Liga II players
ASC Oțelul Galați players
FC Botoșani players
CS Concordia Chiajna players